Abdul Ghaffar Wattoo is a Pakistani politician who has been a member of the National Assembly of Pakistan since August 2018.

Political career
He was elected to the National Assembly of Pakistan from Constituency NA-166 (Bahawalnagar-I) as an independent candidate in 2018 Pakistani general election. Following his successful election, he announced to join Pakistan Tehreek-e-Insaf (PTI) in August 2018.

External Link

More Reading
 List of members of the 15th National Assembly of Pakistan

References

Living people
Pakistani MNAs 2018–2023
Year of birth missing (living people)